Băleni may refer to several places in Romania:

 Băleni, a commune in Dâmboviţa County
 Băleni, a commune in Galați County
 Băleni, a village in Lazuri de Beiuș Commune, Bihor County